Big Jack is a 1949 American Western film starring Wallace Beery, Richard Conte and Marjorie Main. The movie was directed by Richard Thorpe, and the screenplay was written by Gene Fowler and Otto Eis from the novel by Robert Thoeren. The picture is a comedy-drama, set on the American frontier in the early 1800s, about outlaws who befriend a young doctor in legal trouble for acquiring corpses for anatomical research.

This was Wallace Beery's final film, believed to be his 230th. He died on April 15, 1949 at age 64, three days after this movie's release. Also the final film to have a musical score by Herbert Stothart, who had died two months before the film's release.

Plot

Cast
 Wallace Beery as Big Jack Horner
 Richard Conte as Dr. Alexander Meade
 Marjorie Main as Flapjack Kate
 Edward Arnold as Mayor Mahoney
 Vanessa Brown as Patricia Mahoney
 Clinton Sundberg as C. Petronius Smith
 Charles Dingle as Mathias Taylor
 Clem Bevans as Saltlick Joe
 Jack Lambert as Bud Valentine
 Will Wright as Will Farnsworth
 William Phillips as Toddy 
 Syd Saylor as Pokey
 Andy Clyde as Putt Clegghorn
 Richard Alexander as Bandit (uncredited)

Reception
According to MGM records the film earned $759,000 in the US and Canada and $156,000 elsewhere, resulting in a $291,000 loss.

See also
The other six Wallace Beery and Marjorie Main films:
 Wyoming (1940)
 Barnacle Bill (1941)
 Jackass Mail (1942)
 The Bugle Sounds (1942)
 Rationing (1944)
 Bad Bascomb (1946)

References

External links
 
 
 Big Jack in Turner Classic Movies
 Big Jack overview in The New York Times
 Original review for Big Jack in The New York Times
 Big Jack in TV Guide

1949 films
1949 Western (genre) films
American black-and-white films
1940s English-language films
Films directed by Richard Thorpe
Films scored by Herbert Stothart
Metro-Goldwyn-Mayer films
American Western (genre) films
1940s American films